Dumitru Velea (born 11 February 1944) is a Romanian equestrian. He competed in the team jumping event at the 1980 Summer Olympics.

References

External links
 

1944 births
Living people
Romanian male equestrians
Olympic equestrians of Romania
Equestrians at the 1980 Summer Olympics
Sportspeople from Bucharest